Tangerine Records was a record label founded by musician Ray Charles in 1962. Charles switched to the label in 1966. Tangerine was promoted and distributed by ABC-Paramount Records.  Early singles labels were orange and later became black, red and white. Many of the later recordings are now sought after in "Northern Soul" circles. After Charles left ABC in 1973, he closed Tangerine and started Crossover Records. Ray Charles Enterprises owns the catalog.

Notable releases

Albums 

 1966: Crying Time – Ray Charles
 1967: Ray's Moods – Ray Charles
 1967: Ray Charles Invites You to Listen – Ray Charles
 1968: A Portrait of Ray – Ray Charles
 1969: Vibrations – Rita Graham (a Raelette at the time) 
 1970: Souled Out – The Raeletts with Ike & Tina Turner
 1971: Volcanic Action of My Soul – Ray Charles

Hit singles 

 1963: "River's Invitation" (#99 Pop / #25 R&B) – Percy Mayfield
 1966: "I Don't Need No Doctor" (#75 Pop / #45 R&B) – Ray Charles
 1967: "One Hurt Deserves Another" (#76 Pop / #24 R&B) – The Raelettes
 1967: "Here We Go Again" (#15 Pop / #5 R&B) – Ray Charles
 1968: "Eleanor Rigby" (#35 Pop / #30 R&B) – Ray Charles
 1968: "I'm Gett'n Long Alright" (#23 R&B) – The Raelettes
 1968: "I Want To Thank You" (#47 R&B) – The Raelettes
 1970: "I Want To (Do Everything for You)" (#96 Pop / #39 R&B) – The Raelettes
 1970: "Bad Water" (#58 Pop / #40 R&B) – The Raelettes
 1971: "Dust My Broom" (#54 Cash Box R&B) – Ike & Tina Turner
 1971: "Don't Change on Me" (#36 Pop / #13 R&B) – Ray Charles
 1972: "Booty Butt" (#31 Pop / #13 R&B) – Ray Charles

Roster 
Acts signed to Tangerine included:

 Ray Charles
 The Raelettes
 Ike & Tina Turner 
 Jimmy Scott
 Al Grey
 Percy Mayfield
 Louis Jordan
 The Ohio Players
 Lula Reed
 David Thorne

References

Bibliography

External links
 Album discography
 Singles discography

American record labels
Rhythm and blues record labels
Pop record labels
Ray Charles
Record labels established in 1962
Record labels disestablished in 1973